The Plant Molecular Biology is a peer-reviewed scientific journal covering all aspects of plant molecular biology. It was established in 1981 and is published by Springer Science+Business Media. The editor-in-chief is Motoaki Seki.

According to the Journal Citation Reports, the journal has a 2020 impact factor of 4.076.

References

External links 

 

Publications established in 1981
Biochemistry journals
English-language journals
Springer Science+Business Media academic journals